"Bobo" is a song performed by Colombian singer J Balvin, released as the second single, by Universal Music Group on May 13, 2016 for his studio album Energía. The song reached number one in Mexico, as well as the top 10 in Argentina, Colombia, Dominican Republic, Ecuador, Guatemala and Panama, and the top 20 in Chile and Spain.

Charts

Weekly charts

Year-end charts

Certifications

See also
List of number-one songs of 2016 (Mexico)
List of Billboard number-one Latin songs of 2016

References 

J Balvin songs
2016 singles
2016 songs
Songs written by J Balvin
Capitol Latin singles